The Dabbs Store is a historic retail building at 1320 South Avalon Street in West Memphis, Arkansas, United States.  It is a brick two-story structure, located near the railroad tracks and the site of a now-demolished train depot in an isolated area of West Memphis.  The building has two storefronts and a central entrance leading to the upper floor, which houses residential spaces.  The storefronts are similarly styled but differ in size, that on the left wider due to larger windows flanking its entrance.  The windows of the storefronts are mounted on decorative wooden panels, and there are a series of large transom windows above the porch roof, matching the width of each storefront.  Built in 1912, it is one of the oldest surviving commercial structures in the city.

The building was listed on the National Register of Historic Places in 1982.

See also
National Register of Historic Places listings in Crittenden County, Arkansas

References

Commercial buildings on the National Register of Historic Places in Arkansas
Buildings and structures completed in 1912
Buildings and structures in West Memphis, Arkansas
1912 establishments in Arkansas
National Register of Historic Places in Crittenden County, Arkansas